CXT can stand for:

International CXT, a large luxury pick-up truck by Navistar International Corporation.
Charters Towers Airport (IATA: CXT), Charters Towers, Queensland, Australia
CxT, an abbreviation for customer experience transformation
An abbreviation for the band Crazy Town
An abbreviation for Christmas Island Time, the time zone in the Australian territory of Christmas Island (UTC+7)